"Utopia, LOL" is a 2017 science fiction short story by Jamie Wahls. It was first published in Strange Horizons.

Synopsis

After Charlie is revived from suspended animation,  is his guide to the distant future.

Reception

"Utopia, LOL" was a finalist for the Nebula Award for Best Short Story of 2017.

Tangent Online observed that despite Kit's essentially "scatterbrained" nature, the story ends on a "serious, and even inspiring" note. Locus considered it to be "very nice", with a "resolution that snaps home beautifully", but criticized Wahls' portrayal of Kit as having a "somewhat anachronistic contemporary voice (text-speak, essentially)" (while conceding that this could most likely be explained away as a translation).

References

External links
Text of the story

Transhumanism in fiction
2017 short stories